Jordi Malela-Ndangba (born 14 January 1996) is a Belgian professional footballer who plays for La Louvière, as a defender.

Career
Malela has played for Club Brugge, Standard Liège, RKC Waalwijk, Rebecq and La Louvière.

References

1996 births
Living people
Belgian footballers
Club Brugge KV players
Standard Liège players
RKC Waalwijk players
R.U.S. Rebecquoise players
Eerste Divisie players
Association football defenders
Belgian expatriate footballers
Belgian expatriate sportspeople in the Netherlands
Expatriate footballers in the Netherlands
RAAL La Louvière players